Poprad–Tatry Airport  is an airport in the Slovak ski resort town of Poprad. It is an airport with one of the highest elevations in Central Europe, at 718 m, which is 150 m higher than Innsbruck Airport in Austria, and 989 m lower than Samedan Airport in Switzerland.

Services 
The airport serves schedule and charter airline operations, is a base for search and rescue air services, and handles general aviation. It does not offer any domestic flights. Charter flights are mainly operated in winter. Medical flights, VIP flights, ad hoc charters and ACMI flight also operate from the airport.

Airlines and destinations 

Wizz Air UK is currently the only operator with regularly scheduled flights to and from Poprad–Tatry Airport, connecting only Luton Airport operating two to three weekly flights:

Statistics

Passenger throughput and operations since 2014:

Accidents and incidents 
On 20 December 1980, a East German Interflug Flight 302, a Tupolev Tu-134 en route from Berlin Schönefeld to Budapest Ferenc Liszt received a bomb threat, saying that the bomb would go off once the plane descends lower than 600 meters. Since the Poprad Airport is located at 718 meters, the plane was diverted there. Upon landing, a backpack was found which did not belong to any of the passengers.

According to Slovak police, during a routine training exercise involving police dogs at Poprad Airport on 2 January 2010, an officer from Slovakia’s Border and Foreigners’ Police put two pieces of a high explosive, hexogen (RDX), which experts say is more powerful than TNT, among the luggage of passengers travelling on a Danube Wings airline flight from Poprad to Dublin, Ireland. The dogs succeeded in finding both pieces, but the policeman accidentally left one of them, a package containing 95g of the substance, among the luggage. When he realised his mistake, he notified the airport administration but not his superiors, whom he informed only on 4 January 2010.

On 3 August 2012 during the construction works the Mi-8 helicopter of TECHMONT company flew several times to Chata pod Rysmi mountain hut, located at 2250 meters over the sea. When the goods were offloaded there (carried on the rope under the helicopter), during the steep descent through the valley the free end of the rope hit the tail rotor blades, causing damage to it. The crew was able to fly the chopper to Poprad airport, but on approach controlling the helicopter became more and more difficult until it crash-landed within the airport perimeter and rolled to its side with main rotor and tail section destructed. Two from three members onboard received minor injuries.

On 26 May 2021 after landing of Aerospool WT-9 Dynamic nose wheel collapsed, pilot escaped unhurt.

References

External links

Poprad–Tatry Airport (official site, English version)

Airports in Slovakia
Poprad
Buildings and structures in Prešov Region